Hilda L. Smith is an American historian.

Smith completed a Ph.D. at the University of Chicago in 1975. Her dissertation was titled Feminism in Seventeenth-century England.

Smith was a faculty member at the University of Maryland, College Park where she was a humanities administrator. In 1987, she joined the University of Cincinnati. She is specialized in the gender analysis of political theory and intellectual history and the "political, philosophical, and scientific writings of early modern women.

Selected works

References

Citations

Bibliography 

Living people
20th-century American historians
American women historians
Women's studies academics
21st-century American historians
University of Chicago alumni
University of Maryland, College Park faculty
University of Cincinnati faculty
21st-century American women writers
20th-century American women writers
Year of birth missing (living people)